Saatlı may refer to:
Saatly Rayon, Azerbaijan
Saatlı (city), capital of Saatly Rayon
Saatlı, Barda, Azerbaijan